Thomas Fitzgerald Dolan (born September 15, 1975) is an American former competition swimmer, two-time Olympic champion, and former world record-holder.

Dolan grew up in Arlington, Virginia. He attended the University of Michigan, Ann Arbor, where he swam for coach Jon Urbanchek's Michigan Wolverines swimming and diving team in National Collegiate Athletic Association (NCAA) competition from 1994 to 1997. During his college swimming career, he won individual NCAA national championships in the 500-yard freestyle (1995, 1996), 1,650-yard freestyle (1995, 1996), and 400-yard individual medley (1995, 1996), and was a member of three of Michigan's winning teams in the 800-yard freestyle relay (1994, 1995, 1996).

Dolan represented the United States at two consecutive Summer Olympics. At the 1996 Summer Olympics in Atlanta, Georgia, he won a gold medal in the men's 400-meter individual medley, finishing with a time 4:14.90. He also competed in the men's 200-meter individual medley, placing seventh in the event final with a time 2:03.89.

Four years later at the 2000 Summer Olympics in Sydney, Australia, Dolan again won a gold medal in the men's 400-meter individual medley, and setting a new world record of 4:11.76 in the final. He also received the silver medal for his second-place performance in the men's 200-meter individual medley (1:59.77).

Dolan was inducted into the International Swimming Hall of Fame as an "Honor Swimmer" in 2006, and the Virginia Sports Hall of Fame in 2009.  He now runs the Tom Dolan Swim School in Northern Virginia, teaching infants to adults fundamentals that are essential for water safety, recreational swimming, and competitive swimming.

See also
 List of members of the International Swimming Hall of Fame
 List of Olympic medalists in swimming (men)
 List of University of Michigan alumni
 List of World Aquatics Championships medalists in swimming (men)
 World record progression 400 metres individual medley

References

External links
 
 
  Tom Dolan Swim School – Official website of the Tom Dolan Swim School

1975 births
Living people
American male medley swimmers
World record setters in swimming
Michigan Wolverines men's swimmers
Olympic gold medalists for the United States in swimming
Olympic silver medalists for the United States in swimming
People from Arlington County, Virginia
Swimmers at the 1996 Summer Olympics
Swimmers at the 2000 Summer Olympics
World Aquatics Championships medalists in swimming
Yorktown High School (Virginia) alumni
Medalists at the 2000 Summer Olympics
Medalists at the 1996 Summer Olympics
Big Ten Athlete of the Year winners
20th-century American people